Jabez Franklin Cowdery (1835-1914) was an American author, attorney, and politician who served in the California State Assembly from the 8th district between 1875 and 1877 and the 13th district between 1879 and 1881. He also served as the 23rd Speaker of the California State Assembly between January and April 1880.

References 

1835 births
1914 deaths
Speakers of the California State Assembly